The Alfred Döblin Prize is a German literary award. Named after Alfred Döblin, it was endowed by Günter Grass in 1979. The prize is awarded every two years jointly by the Academy of Arts, Berlin and the Literary Colloquium Berlin for substantial unpublished literary works in progress.

The current prize level on offer is 15,000 Euros. It is a requirement of the award that finalists take part in a reading competition: nominees are invited to the Literary Colloquium Berlin where they read out their texts and open them to discussion. Since 2007, selected authors' presentations have been recorded and made available on the German literary portal Literaturport.

The prize winner is nominated by the jury directly after the reading; the awards ceremony then takes place traditionally the following day at the Academy of Arts, Berlin.

Winners 

1979: Gerold Späth
1980: Klaus Hoffer
1981: Gert Hofmann
1983: Gerhard Roth
1985: Stefan Schütz
1987: Libuše Moníková
1989: Einar Schleef, Edgar Hilsenrath
1991: Peter Kurzeck, Förderpreis and Norbert Bleisch 
1993: Reinhard Jirgl, Förderpreis and Andreas Neumeister
1995: Katja Lange-Müller, Förderpreis and Ingo Schulze
1997: Ingomar von Kieseritzky, Michael Wildenhain
1999: Norbert Gstrein
2001: Josef Winkler, Förderpreis and Heike Geißler
2003: Kathrin Groß-Striffler
2005: Jan Faktor
2007: Michael Kumpfmüller
2009: Eugen Ruge
2011: Jan Peter Bremer
2013: Saša Stanišić
2015: Natascha Wodin
2017: María Cecilia Barbetta
2019: Ulrich Woelk
2021: Deniz Utlu

References

External links
 

German literary awards
1979 establishments in Germany
Awards established in 1979
Günter Grass